Tartu Big Diamonds was an Estonian professional ice hockey team who played in the Latvian Hockey Higher League (Samsung premjerliga). They were founded in 2007, and played their first game, a friendly match against Eesti Noortekoondis on 06.08.07 in Narva. Big Diamonds won 20:2 (8:0;6:2;6:0). The Big Diamonds played 10 of the team's home games in Tartu, 4 in Narva, 4 in Tallinn, and 2 in Kohtla-Järve. They dissolved in the summer of 2008 due to financial problems

Final roster

Notable players
D  4  Aleksandr Ossipov 07.08.1987 175/80
D  7  Kirill Kolpakov 19.07.1982
F 10  Aleksei Sibirtsev 05.12.1987 180/75
F 13  Maksim Brandis 30.08.1988 175/80
D 14  Anton Levkovitsh 25.04.1983 182/76
F 17  Dmitri Lavrov 17.10.1984 178/82
F 19  Aleksandr Polozov 16.04.1986 175/80
F 21  Ilja Iljin 15.08.1987 180/77
F 23  Anton Jastrebov 05.03.1988 180/77
F 25  Viktors Lobacovs 15.04.1986
F 27  Oleg Puzanov 19.01.1967 176/76
D 28  Kristaps Bužāts 04.01.1989
F --  Deniss Konosev 24.03.1983 184/89
D --  Robert Pukalovic 11.07.1984 185/82
F --  Oleg Puzanov 	19.01.1967 176/67
D --  Ilja Urõšev 	16.06.1987 184/79

Notable coaches
C --  Leonīds Beresņevs 	06.07.1958 (to ASK Ogre)

The general manager was Vladimir Makrov.

References
Estonian Ice Hockey Association
HC Big Diamonds Tartu details Eurohockey.com

External links
Homepage

2007 establishments in Estonia
Ice hockey clubs established in 2007
Ice hockey teams in Estonia
Latvian Hockey League teams